Acampo (Spanish for "Pasture") is a small census-designated place (CDP) just north of Lodi in San Joaquin County, California, United States. In the 1870s, Acampo was named as a Southern Pacific Railroad station. Acampo's population was 341 at the 2010 census.

Name
Acampo was laid out in 1876 when the railroad was extended to that point. The name comes from a Spanish word for "portion of the common given to the herds for pasture". A post office called Acampo has been in operation since 1872.

Geography
According to the United States Census Bureau, the CDP covers an area of 0.9 square miles (2.4 km), all of it land.

Demographics

The 2010 United States Census reported that Acampo had a population of 341. The racial makeup of Acampo was 169 (49.6%) White, 0 (0.0%) African American, 1 (0.3%) Native American, 3 (0.9%) Asian, 8 (2.3%) Pacific Islander, 136 (39.9%) from other races, and 24 (7.0%) from two or more races. Hispanic or Latino of any race were 199 persons (58.4%).

The Census reported that 341 people (100% of the population) lived in households, 0 (0%) lived in non-institutionalized group quarters, and 0 (0%) were institutionalized.

There were 94 households, out of which 48 (51.1%) had children under the age of 18 living in them, 54 (57.4%) were opposite-sex married couples living together, 11 (11.7%) had a female householder with no husband present, 7 (7.4%) had a male householder with no wife present.  There were 8 (8.5%) unmarried opposite-sex partnerships, and 1 (1.1%) same-sex married couples or partnerships. 14 households (14.9%) were made up of individuals, and 4 (4.3%) had someone living alone who was 65 years of age or older. The average household size was 3.63.  There were 72 families (76.6% of all households); the average family size was 4.11.

The population was spread out, with 105 people (30.8%) under the age of 18, 37 people (10.9%) aged 18 to 24, 79 people (23.2%) aged 25 to 44, 83 people (24.3%) aged 45 to 64, and 37 people (10.9%) who were 65 years of age or older.  The median age was 30.6 years. For every 100 females, there were 114.5 males.  For every 100 females age 18 and over, there were 108.8 males.

The homeowner vacancy rate was 0%; the rental vacancy rate was 2.6%.  195 people (57.2% of the population) lived in owner-occupied housing units and 146 people (42.8%) lived in rental housing units.

Education
Acampo students are zoned to Lodi Unified School District schools. Houston Middle School is in Acampo.

Oak View Elementary School District operates a single K-8 school in an unincorporated area near, but not in, Acampo. High school students in the Oak View area attend the Galt Joint Union High School District.

References 

Census-designated places in San Joaquin County, California
Census-designated places in California